Samar Roy (1 February 1917 – 6 August 1997) was an Indian cricket umpire. He stood in six Test matches between 1961 and 1969.

See also
 List of Test cricket umpires

References

1917 births
1997 deaths
Place of birth missing
Indian Test cricket umpires